Widów may refer to the following places:
Widów, Masovian Voivodeship (east-central Poland)
Widów, Silesian Voivodeship (south Poland)
Widów, West Pomeranian Voivodeship (north-west Poland)